The Presbyterian Church in Korea (HapDongYeChong I) was formed when 4 Presbyteries split from the Presbyterian Church in Korea (HapDongBoSu) under the leadership of Pastor Dogo Bong-Mun. The denomination subscribes the Apostles Creed and the Westminster Confession. In 2004 it had 2,260 members in 45 local congregations and 66 ordained ministers.

References 

Presbyterian denominations in South Korea
Presbyterian denominations in Asia